Abdallah Zohdy (3 December 1928 – 8 April 1968) was an Egyptian sports shooter. He competed in the 25 metre pistol event at the 1964 Summer Olympics.

References

External links
 

1928 births
1968 deaths
Egyptian male sport shooters
Olympic shooters of Egypt
Shooters at the 1964 Summer Olympics
Place of birth missing